Jackie Kearney is a British cook specialising in vegetarian and vegan street food, drawing especially from Asian cuisine. Kearney works as a chef and food development consultant, as well as running The Hungry Gecko dining club. She has a food trailer called Barbarella, and has published several vegan cookbooks.

Career
Kearney worked for the National Institute for Health and Care Excellence before taking a year-long trip around South East Asia. Upon her return, she was a finalist in the British television cookery competition MasterChef. Kearney participated in the 2011 series of the programme, finishing fourth. The Hungry Gecko, Kearney's dining club, was established in the same year, and she launched  food truck called Barbarella. Kearney with her vegetarian street food truck, she was a finalist in the British Street Food Awards in 2012.

Kearney went on to publish her first book, Vegan Street Food, in 2015. Though she is a vegetarian, not a vegan, the book ended up being predominantly vegan, and she removed the non-vegan elements at her publisher's suggestion. The book won the PETA UK Vegan Food Award for Cookbook of the Year 2016. Further vegan cookbooks followed, focussing on comfort food, mock meat, and Christmas food.

Critical response 
Kearney's books have been reviewed by critics. In 2018, Coach Mag named Vegan Street Food one of the Best Vegan Cookbooks. In reviewing Vegan Christmas Feasts, U.S. journalist Avery Yale Kamila said "Kearney calls upon her British heritage and her travels for a collection of celebratory recipes that feel nostalgic yet a wee bit novel." Journalist Selene Nelson listed My Vegan Travels on a list of her three favorite vegan cookbooks. In 2016, MasterChef Tim Anderson said he was cooking from Vegan Street Food.

Books
Vegan Street Food: Foodie Travels from India to Indonesia (2015, Ryland Peters & Small)
My Vegan Travels: Comfort Food Inspired by Adventure (2017, Ryland Peters & Small)
Vegan Mock Meat Revolution: Delicious Plant-Based Recipes (2018, Ryland Peters & Small)
Vegan Christmas Feasts: Inspired Meat-Free Recipes for the Festive Season (2019, Ryland Peters & Small)

References

External links
The Hungry Gecko

Living people
Year of birth missing (living people)
Reality cooking competition contestants
English chefs
Chefs of vegan cuisine
Women chefs
British cookbook writers
Vegan cookbook writers
Women cookbook writers